Romulus Zachariah Linney IV  (September 21, 1930 – January 15, 2011) was an American playwright and novelist.

Life and career

Linney was born in Philadelphia, the son of Maitland (née Thompson) Linney and physician Romulus Zachariah Linney III. His great-grandfather was Romulus Zachariah Linney, a prominent North Carolinian who served in the American Civil War and as a U.S. Congressman. Linney grew up in the town of Madison, Tennessee where his father was a regular M.D. He also lived with his extended family for a few years during the Great Depression in the Linney/Coffey homestead in Boone, North Carolina and returned to the homestead to visit his favorite cousins, the Coffeys, throughout his life. Linney recalled that his mother "was a very good amateur actress" and when she starred in the Nashville Community Theatre's 1940 production of Our Town as Mrs. Gibbs, he was deeply moved by her performance, particularly by her character's death. "I became really connected to my mother and it was the first time I was really shattered by a play. And in many ways that was the beginning. It, in a very visceral way, showed me the profound impact theater can have... Music might give you exultation or something else equally profound, but theater at a great stroke can just shatter you, can break you." Linney's father died of throat cancer when Linney was 13 years old. Linney said about his father's death, "I've never gotten over it. My father was a very good man...I think his death is in everything I do. All other experiences in life pall beside the death of a parent you dearly love, when you have to deal with that as a child. No religion can console you for it. Nothing can." After his father's death, Linney and his mother moved to Washington, D.C., where he attended middle school and high school.

He earned a Bachelor of Arts degree from Oberlin College and a Master of Fine Arts degree from the Yale School of Drama. He is an alumnus of HB Studio in New York City. He authored three novels, four opera librettos, twenty short stories, and 85 plays which have been staged throughout the United States from South Coast Repertory in California to the Virginia Museum Theater (VMT) in Richmond, and in Europe and Asia. His plays include The Sorrows of Frederick, Holy Ghosts, Childe Byron, Heathen Valley, and an adaptation of Ernest J. Gaines's novel, A Lesson Before Dying, which has been produced in New York and in numerous regional theaters. Many of his plays were set in Appalachia (Tennessee, Holy Ghosts, Sand Mountain, Gint and Heathen Valley), while others focused on historical subjects (The Sorrows of Frederick, King Philip, 2: Goering at Nuremberg). His adaptations for the American stage of several modern foreign classics—plays and tales from Tolstoy, Chekhov, Ibsen and others—have been performed from New York to Minneapolis, and his melding of two novels by Henry Adams into the comedy Democracy was premiered by artistic director Keith Fowler at VMT.  Linney's vivid biographical reconstructions of controversial personalities are remarkable for their power to retain a lifelike vigor—as in his treatment of Hermann Goering in 2: Goering at Nuremberg, and Lord Byron in Childe Byron.

In 2010 before his death, Linney completed a libretto for an opera by Scott Wheeler based on his first play The Sorrows of Frederick commissioned by The Metropolitan Opera and Lincoln Center Theater. He also completed a full-length play about Alzheimer's disease, Over Martinis, Driving Somewhere, which received a workshop at New York Stage and Film in the summer of 2010.

Among Linney's many awards were two Obie awards, one for sustained excellence in play writing; two National Critics Awards; three Drama-Logue Awards; and fellowships from the Guggenheim and Rockefeller foundations, the New York Foundation for the Arts and the National Endowment of the Arts. He was a member of the American Academy of Arts and Letters, which conferred upon him its Award in Literature, Award of Merit and its highest award, the gold medal. He received honorary doctorates from Oberlin College in 1994, from Appalachian State University in 1995, and from Wake Forest University in 1998.

He was a member of the Ensemble Studio Theatre, the Fellowship of Southern Writers, National Theatre Conference, College of Fellows of the American Theatre, American Academy of Arts and Sciences, the American Academy of Arts and Letters, and the Corporation of Yaddo.  Linney had been chair of the MFA Playwriting program at Columbia University’s School of the Arts and Professor of Playwriting in the Actors Studio MFA Program at The New School in New York. He also taught over the years at Princeton, University of Pennsylvania, Connecticut College, and the Sewanee Writers Conference among others.

Linney was the founding playwright of Signature Theatre Company, which named a theater in his honor in the new Signature Center, which opened in 2012.  On his birthday September 21, 2012, the University of North Carolina at its Appalachian State University campus in Boone, NC opened his archives for researchers and scholars.

Death
Romulus Linney died from lung cancer at his home in Germantown, New York on January 15, 2011.

Family
He was the father of two daughters, Susan Linney and actress Laura Linney.

At the time of death, he was married to Laura Callanan, former senior deputy chair of the National Endowment for the Arts and founding partner of Upstart Co-Lab.

Works
The plays of Romulus Linney include:

 2: Goering at Nuremberg
 Akhmatova
 Ambrosio
 Appalachia Sounding
 April Snow
 Ave Maria
 Can Can
 The Captivity of Pixie Shedman
 Childe Byron
 Choir Practice
 A Christmas Carol
 Clair de Lune
 The Death of King Philip
 Democracy
 Democracy and Esther
 El Hermano
 F.M.
 Gardens of Eden
 Gint
 Gold and Silver Waltz
 Goodbye Oscar
 Goodbye, Howard
 Heathen Valley
 Holy Ghosts
 Hrosvitha
 Juliet
 Just Folks
 Klonsky and Schwartz
 Komachi
 Lark
 Laughing Stock
 A Lesson Before Dying
 Love Drunk
 The Love Suicide at Schofield Barracks
 Masterbuilder Johnson
 Mountain Memory
 Old Man Joseph and His Family
 Oscar Over Here
 Over Martinis, Driving Somewhere
 Pageant
 Patronage
 Pops
 Precious Memories
 Sand Mountain
 Sand Mountain Matchmaking
 The Seasons, Man's Estate
 Shotgun
 Songs of Love
 The Sorrows of Frederick
 Southern Comfort
 Spain
 Stars
 Strindberg: Miss Julie and The Ghost Sonata
 Tennessee
 Three Poets
 True Crimes
 Two Whores
 Unchanging Love
 Why the Lord Come to Sand Mountain
 A Woman Without a Name
 Wrath
 Yancey
 Yankee Doodle

References

External links

 

1930 births
2011 deaths
Deaths from lung cancer in New York (state)
Linney family
Members of the American Academy of Arts and Letters
Oberlin College alumni
People from Boone, North Carolina
People from Nashville, Tennessee
Writers from Philadelphia
Writers from North Carolina
Writers from Tennessee
Yale School of Drama alumni
MacDowell Colony fellows
20th-century American dramatists and playwrights
American opera librettists
American male novelists
20th-century American novelists
21st-century American dramatists and playwrights
American male dramatists and playwrights
20th-century American male writers
21st-century American male writers